is a work for piano by the French composer Olivier Messiaen, written in 1970. The piece is based principally on the song of the garden warbler, the French name of which is the title of the composition, but features eighteen other birds. The imagined setting of the piece is the Dauphiny mountains of Isère during a mid-summer night and the following day.

References

Compositions for solo piano
Compositions by Olivier Messiaen
1970 compositions